Luis de Santángel (died 1498) was a third generation converso in Spain during the late fifteenth century.  Santángel worked as escribano de ración to King Ferdinand II and Queen Isabella I of Spain which left him in charge of the Royal finance.  Santángel played an instrumental role in Christopher Columbus's voyage in 1492, for he managed to convince the Catholic monarchs to fund Columbus's expedition and provided a large sum of the money himself.

Columbus's voyage

Funding
In 1486, Columbus met with Ferdinand II and Isabella I to propose his plan of finding a passage to India by sailing west rather than east.  While the Spanish monarchs were interested in his plans, they turned him down on the basis that they were financially tied up with fighting the Moors.  To prevent Columbus from seeking out competing monarchs and nations, Ferdinand II and Isabella provided Columbus with a retainer of 12,000 maravedis (about USD $840 in modern currency), and in 1489, they provided him with documentation to obtain food and lodging in any Spanish municipality.

Following the Spanish victory against the Moors, Columbus was called to meet with the Spanish Monarchs again on January 12, 1492, to discuss funding his voyage. Isabella was still not convinced, and Columbus left the meeting upset, confiding in Santángel that he planned to seek financial funding from France or England—whichever nation agreed first.  Using his position as a royal treasurer, Santángel met with Isabella and convinced her to accept Columbus's proposal by alluding to the fame and glory that would come with Columbus's success in finding a new sea-route to the Indies.  Going a step further, Santángel arranged for the majority of the funding by contributing much from his own pocket and additional money he had borrowed. He did so to keep the queen from having to pawn the crown jewels.

Columbus's first letter
Columbus's letter on the first voyage was addressed to Santángel.

Jewish heritage
Santángel's grandfather, the Jewish Azarias Chinillo, converted to Christianity during the fifteenth century and changed his name to Luis de Santángel.  After this conversion, the Santángel family began to prosper economically and in status; all three Santángels served the Royal crown and possessed a large sum of wealth.

Spanish Inquisition 
While the Spanish Inquisition targeted and persecuted Jews, including conversos believed to be practicing Judaism privately, Santángel and his immediate family were protected from the persecution. However, one of his relatives was burned at the stake in Saragossa. On May 30, 1497, Ferdinand II issued a royal decree that exempted Santángel, his family, and his future successors, from the Inquisition.

Despite this protection and high status, Santángel was believed to have wanted to help Jews escape their persecution by funding Columbus's journey, which would potentially offer a safer place for them to reside. After his expeditions, Columbus was granted the island of Jamaica, which became a place of refuge for many Sephardi Jews after their expulsion from Spain and Portugal.

Inspiration for By Fire, By Water 
In April 2010, author Mitchell James Kaplan published a book titled By Fire, By Water that explored a fictitious retelling of Luis de Santángel's life during the 15th century.  The novel, while not necessarily accurate, incorporated prominent events and situations such as Santángel's position in the Royal court, the Spanish Inquisition, and Columbus's journey.  It discusses the impact of the Spanish Inquisition on conversos who were often still suspected when it came to religion and explores Santángel's desperate intervention towards Columbus's meetings with the Spanish Monarchs in attempt to discover a place that offers acceptance rather than terror and violence for Jews and conversos at the time.

References

External links
Letter from Columbus to Luis de Santángel  (pdf)
Jewish-American Hall of Fame

Christopher Columbus
Converts to Roman Catholicism from Judaism
Spanish Roman Catholics
Spanish Jews
1498 deaths
Conversos
Year of birth unknown
Spanish people of Jewish descent